Aaron James Horvath (born August 19, 1980) is an American animator, screenwriter, producer, and director. He is best known for co-developing Teen Titans Go! alongside Michael Jelenic for Cartoon Network as well as directing the upcoming film The Super Mario Bros. Movie along with Jelenic. Horvath made his directorial debut on the feature film Teen Titans Go! To the Movies (2018), which he directed alongside Peter Rida Michail.

Filmography

Film

Television

Video games

References

External links
 

Living people
21st-century American screenwriters
American animated film directors
American animated film producers
American television directors
American television producers
American male television writers
Animators from California
Film directors from California
Film producers from California
Screenwriters from California
Warner Bros. Animation people
American people of Hungarian descent
1980 births